Sulphur Springs is a city in Benton County, Arkansas, United States. The population was 511 at the 2010 census. It is part of the Northwest Arkansas region.

History
Sulphur Springs got its start in 1885 as a mineral spa resort.

Geography
Sulphur Springs is located in northwest Benton County. The city center is about one mile south of the Missouri-Arkansas state line. Arkansas Highway 59 runs through the city, leading north to Noel, Missouri, and south to Gravette.

Demographics

At the 2000 census, there were 671 people, 229 households and 160 families residing in the city. The racial makeup of the city was 86.74% White, 2.24% Black or African American, 0.89% Native American, 0.30% Asian, 7.15% from other races, and 2.68% from two or more races. Hispanic or Latino of any race were 16.69% of the population.

There were 229 households, of which 40.2% had children under the age of 18 living with them, 52.4% were married couples living together, 11.4% had a female householder with no husband present, and 29.7% were non-families. 24.0% of all households were made up of individuals, and 12.2% had someone living alone who was 65 years of age or older. The average household size was 2.93 and the average family size was 3.45.

32.8% of the population were under the age of 18, 9.2% from 18 to 24, 27.6% from 25 to 44, 18.9% from 45 to 64, and 11.5% who were 65 years of age or older. The median age was 30 years. For every 100 females, there were 95.1 males. For every 100 females age 18 and over, there were 90.3 males.

The median household income was $25,536 and the median family income was $29,844. Males had a median income of $21,354 and females $19,000. The per capita income was $9,542. About 20.0% of families and 25.8% of the population were below the poverty line, including 30.2% of those under age 18 and 10.0% of those age 65 or over.

Education
It is in the Gravette School District, which operates Gravette High School.

Places of interest
The Harbor House in Sulphur Springs has stood for over one hundred years. It still a Christian hotel and guest house.

Notable people
 Jim Hendren (born 1963), a businessman from Sulphur Springs, represents District 2 in the Arkansas Senate, former member of the Arkansas House of Representatives

References

External links

Cities in Benton County, Arkansas
Cities in Arkansas
Northwest Arkansas
1885 establishments in Arkansas